Miller is an unincorporated community in Lyon County, Kansas, United States.  It is located approximately 5.5 miles east of the city of Admire along Rd W7.

History
Miller was founded in 1910.

The post office in Miller was discontinued in 1958.

Geography
The climate in this area is characterized by hot, humid summers and generally mild to cool winters.  According to the Köppen Climate Classification system, Miller has a humid subtropical climate, abbreviated "Cfa" on climate maps.

Government
The nearest post office to Miller is in Osage City, because the post office in Reading was closed after their 2011 tornado.  The mail is carried out of Lebo.

Education
The community is served by North Lyon County USD 251 public school district.

References

Further reading

External links
 Lyon County maps: Current, Historic, KDOT

Unincorporated communities in Lyon County, Kansas
Unincorporated communities in Kansas